Emmanuel Grenier (born 3 November 1970) is a French mathematician. His research interests include hydrodynamics (e.g. Navier–Stokes equations, Euler equations) and mathematical biology.

Grenier attended École Normale Supérieure from 1990 to 1994, before attaining his doctorate at Pierre and Marie Curie University, under supervision of Yann Brenier. He won an EMS Prize in 2000.

References

External links
Website 

People from Château-Thierry
1970 births
Living people
École Normale Supérieure alumni
20th-century French mathematicians
21st-century French mathematicians
International Mathematical Olympiad participants